Matthew Round-Garrido (born 20 April 2000) is a Spanish-British racing driver. He currently competes in the Indy Pro 2000 Championship with Exclusive Autosport. Round-Garrido previously competed in the U.S. F2000 National Championship with Exclusive Autosport.

Racing career

Indy Pro 2000 
On February 11, 2022, it was announced that Round-Garrido would move up to the Indy Pro 2000 Championship with Exclusive Autosport to compete in the 2022 season.

Racing record

Career summary 

*Season still in progress.

Motorsports career results

American open-wheel racing results

Indy Pro 2000 Championship 
(key) (Races in bold indicate pole position) (Races in italics indicate fastest lap) (Races with * indicate most race laps led)

*Season still in progress.

References 

2000 births
Living people
British racing drivers
Formula Ford drivers
U.S. F2000 National Championship drivers

Indy Pro 2000 Championship drivers
Formula Regional Americas Championship drivers
HMD Motorsports drivers